Eucalyptus annettae is a mallet that is endemic a small area in the south-west of Western Australia. It has rough, dark grey bark on the lower part of its stems and smooth bark on its upper parts. The adult leaves are lance-shaped, the flower buds are ribbed and arranged in groups of seven, the flowers are pale yellow and the fruit are conical with longitudinal ribs.

Description
Eucalyptus annettae is a tree in the form of a mallet that grows to a height of  but does not develop a lignotuber. Thicker stems have hard but thin, dark grey bark while the upper parts have smooth, dull cream-coloured to grey bark that is shed in strips. The stamens are mid-yellow.

Taxonomy and naming
Eucalyptus annettae was first formally described in 2012 Dean Nicolle and Malcolm French and the description was published in Nuytsia from a specimen collected in the Cape Arid National Park. The specific epithet (annettae) honours Annett Borner, the wife of one of the authors.

Distribution and habitat
This tree is only known from a small area near Israelite Bay where it grows in shrubland.

Conservation
Eucalyptus annettae is classified as "Priority Two" by the Western Australian Government Department of Parks and Wildlife meaning that it is poorly known and from only one or a few locations.

See also
List of Eucalyptus species

References

Eucalypts of Western Australia
annettae
Myrtales of Australia
Plants described in 2012